Ginovci is a village in the municipality of Rankovce, North Macedonia.

Name
The name is derived from the Albanian name Gjin.

Demographics
As of the 2021 census, Ginovci had 312 residents with the following ethnic composition:
Macedonians 293
Persons for whom data are taken from administrative sources 19

According to the 2002 census, the village had a total of 315 inhabitants. Ethnic groups in the village include:
Macedonians 308
Serbs 2
Romani 4
Others 1

References

Villages in Rankovce Municipality